Blok M is a TransJakarta bus rapid transit station located at the Blok M bus terminal in Kebayoran Baru, South Jakarta, Jakarta, Indonesia. The station which is in Corridor 1 which runs from north to south is the starting point towards the Kota BRT Station or as the terminus from the opposite direction.

Building and layout 
The Blok M BRT Station for Transjakarta services uses three platforms. The first platform is used for BRT services, the second and third platforms are used for non-BRT services, while the fourth platform is used for Mikrotrans and Royaltrans services.

Supporting Transportation

Train lines

Places nearby 

The station is located in Blok M, where on daily basis crowds of people throng its street, and even more so during night time. Much of the popularity of the quarter is due to the prices of goods (which are often low due to the relatively inexpensive property costs for vendors), and the night life.

 Martha Chritina Tiahahu Literacy Park id
 Wisma Iskarndarsyah
 The Jakarta 6th Public Senior High School (SMAN 6 Jakarta)
 The Jakarta 70th Public Senior High School (SMAN 70 Jakarta)
 The Jakarta 29th Public Vocational School (SMKN 24 Jakarta)
 Pasaraya Grande
 Bulungan Sports Hall
 Blok M Square id
 Blok M Plaza id
 Attorney General's Office of Indonesia
 Indonesian National Police Headquarters
 ASEAN Secretariat
 ASEAN MRT station
 CSW-ASEAN TOD
 M Bloc Space

References

External links 

 

TransJakarta
Bus stations in Indonesia
South Jakarta